Michele Miarelli (born 29 April 1984), is an Italian futsal player who plays for Luparense and the Italian national futsal team.

References

External links
UEFA profile

1984 births
Living people
Futsal goalkeepers
Sportspeople from Rome
Italian men's futsal players
Luparense Calcio a 5 players